Idina (stylized as idina.) is the eponymous fifth studio album by singer Idina Menzel. It was released on September 23, 2016, by Warner Bros. Records.

Overview
In late 2015, Menzel announced via Twitter and in interviews that she was working on a new studio album, set to be released in Fall 2016. On August 5, 2016 at midnight, Menzel appeared on Facebook Live from the Skylark Rooftop in New York City to announce that the album would be released on September 23, 2016, and gave a world premiere performance of her single "I See You".

The week after she announced the album, Menzel appeared on Facebook Live again from The Berkshires with her all-girl performing arts camp A Broader Way, where she gave another sneak preview of a song from the album titled "Queen of Swords" along with the campers. The song was released as a single several days later. Music videos for both "I See You" and "Queen of Swords" were posted to her YouTube channel.

On September 9, Menzel released her third single, "Small World". The fourth single, "Perfect Story", and an accompanying music video were released on September 16.

Menzel also said that the album was her most personal to date.

The album was supported the following year by a World Tour which played in over 50+ cities across North America, Europe, and Asia.

Reception
The album received fairly positive reviews from music critics. AllMusic awarded it 3.5 stars, saying she was able to "craft a sound that's expansive enough to resonate with fans of her stage work while adding a bit of a modern age," particularly drawing attention to "Queen of Swords", "Cake", and "I Do". The review also noted that the album was very personal and was a vast improvement on her last pop album, I Stand. Newsday gave the album a B+, noting her "gorgeous voice" and mentioning "Queen of Swords", "I See You", and "Perfect Story" as stand-out tracks.

Track listing

Charts

References

2016 albums
Idina Menzel albums